Glen Scanlan (born 7 April 1956) is  a former Australian rules footballer who played with North Melbourne and Footscray in the Victorian Football League (VFL).

Notes

External links 
		

Living people
1956 births
Australian rules footballers from Queensland
North Melbourne Football Club players
Western Bulldogs players
Coorparoo Football Club players